{{Infobox television
| image                = Sona Roder Gaan Poster.jpg
| image_alt            = 
| alt_name             = 
| genre                = FamilyRomance
| creator              = 
| based_on             = 
| developer            = Magic Moments Motion Pictures
| writer               = Leena Gangopadhyay
| screenplay           = 
| story                = Leena Gangopadhyay
| opentheme            = Sona Roder Gaan by Anweshaa
| director             = 
| creative_director    = 
| starring             = 
| theme_music_composer = 
| music                = 
| country              = India
| language             = Bengali
| num_seasons          = 1
| num_episodes         = 306 
| executive_producer   = 
| producer             = 
| location             = Kolkata
| cinematography       = 
| editor               = 
| camera               = Multi-camera
| runtime              = 22 minutes
| company              = 
| network              = Colors Bangla
| picture_format       = SDTV 576iHDTV 1080i
| audio_format         = 
| first_aired          = 
| last_aired           = 
| preceded_by          = 
| endtheme             = 
}}Sona Roder Gaan''' is a Bengali daily soap which aired on Colors Bangla from 24 January 2022. It stars Payel De and Rishi Kaushik. It is the remake of Colors's Thoda sa Baadal Thoda sa Paani''.

Plot 
Anandi is a responsible girl who lives in a joint family with her parents and other family members. She is set to marry her love interest Bikram.  Bikram's family demand dowry from Anandi's father Bishwanath. Biswanath takes a loan to pay dowry and when Anandi discovers this, she refuses to marry. Later, on Biswanath's persuasion, she agrees to the marriage. Meanwhile, Anandi meets Dr. Anubhab, who is Bikram's cousin and also Biswanath's doctor. Anubhab helps Anandi every time. Anandi suspects that Bikram is having an affair with his sister-in-law Shreya.

Biswanath dies on the wedding day due to stress and Anandi breaks her marriage with Bikram. Anandi's mother and sister blame Anandi for Biswanath's death.

To help her family and to pay off debt, Anandi starts work. Meanwhile, Anubhav falls in love with Anandi. Bikram lures Nanda into his fake love to take revenge on Anandi. Nanda marries Bikram despite Anandi's warning. Shreya starts creating trouble for Nanda. Meanwhile, Anubhab's friend Diya, who is in love with Anubhab, gets jealous of Anandi. Diya creates misunderstanding in Anandi and Anubhav's relationship but it eventually improves anyway.

Meanwhile, Anandi's brother Apu falls in love with Bikram's sister, Bulti, but no one agrees to their relationship, but Anandi gets them married. Anubhab meets with an accident and becomes disabled, Anandi helps him.

Cast

Main 
 Payel De as Anandi Mukherjee – Rudrani, Chandrani and Nandini's elder sister, Anubhab's love interest, Vikram's ex-fiancée (2022–present)
 Rishi Kaushik as Dr. Anubhab Chowdhury – Anandi's love interest, Diya's obsession (2022–present)
 Shoumo Banerjee as Vikram Chatterjee – Anandi's ex-boyfriend, Shreya's lover, Nanda's husband (2022–present)

Recurring 
 Sohini Sengupta as Chandana Mukherjee – Anandi , Nanda , Chandra and Jhilik's mother (2022– present)
 Bhaskar Banerjee as Bishwanath Mukherjee – Anandi , Nanda , Chandra and Jhilik's father (2022)
 Anindita Saha Kapileswari / Tanushree Gowsami as Rajeswari Chatterjee - Vikram's mother (2022– present)
 Anindo Sarkar as Vikram's father (2022– present)
 Riya Roy / Nishantika Das as Chandrani Mukherjee aka Chandra– Anandi's younger sister (2022– present)
 Srijani Mitra as Brishti
 Poulomi Das / Sudipta Banerjee as Dr. Diya Lahiri – Anubhab's obsessive lover (2022– present)
 Rajshree Bhowmik as Bina Lahiri– Diya's mother (2022– present)
 Ananya Chattopadhyay as Pishimoni (2022– present)
 Suranjana Roy as Nandini Mukherjee aka Nanda – Anandi's younger sister (2022– present)
 Chaitali Das as Rudrani Mukherjee aka Jhilik– Anandi's younger sister (2022– present)
 Sudip Sarkar
 Debarati Paul
 Rumpa Chatterjee 
 Sudeshna Roy
 Aarush Dey

Adaptations

References 

Bengali-language television programming in India
2022 Indian television series debuts
Television shows set in Kolkata
Colors Bangla original programming